Francis Bell may refer to:

Arthur Bell (martyr) (1590–1643), also known as Francis Bell, Franciscan and English martyr
Dillon Bell (Francis Dillon Bell; 1822–1898), New Zealand politician, father of the New Zealand Prime Minister
Francis Bell (actor) (1944–1994), UK-born New Zealand actor
Francis Bell (New Zealand politician) (1851–1936), Prime Minister of New Zealand
Francis Bell (engineer) (1813–1879), British railway engineer
Francis Hayley Bell (1877–1944), father of Mary Hayley Bell
Francis Campbell Bell (1892–1968), politician in Manitoba, Canada
Francis Jeffrey Bell (1855–1924), English zoologist
Frank Bell (governor) (Francis Jardine Bell; 1840–1927), sixth Governor of Nevada
Gordon Bell (surgeon) (Francis Gordon Bell; 1887–1970), New Zealand surgeon and university professor

See also
Frank Bell (disambiguation)